Lourdes Domínguez Lino is the defending champion but chose not to participate this year. 
Christina McHale defeated Ekaterina Ivanova in the final 6–2, 6–4.

Seeds

Draw

Finals

Top half

Bottom half

References
 Main Draw
 Qualifying Draw

Torneo Internazionale Femminile Antico Tiro a Volo - Singles